Martin James Maloney (8 October 1877 – 21 November 1953) was a Conservative member of the House of Commons of Canada. He was born in Eganville, Ontario and became a physician.

Early life and education 
Malone attended McGill University, where he attained his medical degrees (MD, CM). In 1901, he married Margaret Bonfield whose father was James Bonfield, a member of the Ontario provincial legislature.

Career 
He conducted unsuccessful election campaigns at the Renfrew South riding in the 1911 election, a 22 February 1912 by-election and the 1921 election. He ran as a Conservative, except in 1921 when he sought the seat for the Progressive party. Malone won Renfrew South in the 1925 general election and was re-elected there in 1926 and 1930. In the 1935 election, he was defeated by James Joseph McCann of the Liberal party. Maloney made an unsuccessful effort to unseat McCann in the 1940 federal election.

Family life 
He was married to Margaret Bonfield on 19 February 1901.

Together they had the following children

 James A. Maloney, who became a notable politician
 Henry Joseph Maloney, who became a priest
 Patrick J. Maloney
 Arthur Maloney, who became a notable politician
 Margaret Goden
 Mary Anthony Bonfield
 Elanor Lyons
 Anna Lyons 
 Frances French

References

External links

1877 births
1953 deaths
Physicians from Ontario
Conservative Party of Canada (1867–1942) MPs
Members of the House of Commons of Canada from Ontario